Ollie Kilkenny (born 1962 in Kiltormer, County Galway) is a former Irish sportsperson. He played hurling with his local club Kiltormer and with the Galway senior inter-county team in the 1980s and 1990s.  Kilkenny won back-to-back All-Ireland winners' medals with Galway in 1987 and 1988.

See also
 Giolla Ceallaigh mac Comhaltan, fl. 10th century, ancestor of Kilkelly clan of Galway.
 Padhraic Mac Giolla Chealla, poet and seanchai, fl. 1798.

References

1962 births
Living people
Kiltormer hurlers
Galway inter-county hurlers
Connacht inter-provincial hurlers
All-Ireland Senior Hurling Championship winners